Southport South light rail station is a major light rail stop in the Gold Coast suburb of Southport, the city's Central Business District. The station is situated on the corner of Scarborough Street and Queen Street and services the southern portion of the Gold Coast CBD precinct. Southport South light rail station is serviced by the Gold Coast G:link light rail system with services as frequent as 7 minutes.

Location 
Below is a map of the Gold Coast CBD precinct. The station can be identified by the grey marker.{
  "type": "FeatureCollection",
  "features": [
    {
      "type": "Feature",
      "properties": {},
      "geometry": {
        "type": "Point",
        "coordinates": [
          153.41549873381155,
          -27.972758229168104
        ]
      }
    }
  ]
}

References

External links 

 G:link

G:link stations
Railway stations in Australia opened in 2014
Southport, Queensland